The 2012/13 FIS Nordic Combined World Cup was the 30th world cup season, a combination of ski jumping and cross-country skiing organized by FIS. It started on 24 November 2012 in Lillehammer, Norway and ended on 16 March 2013 in Oslo, Norway.

Calendar

Men

Team

Standings

Overall 

Standings after 17 events.

Nations Cup 

Standings after 22 events.

Achievements
First World Cup podium
, 29, in his 11th season – no. 3 in the WC 3 in Kuusamo
, 25, in his 8th season – no. 3 in the WC 14 in Almaty

Victory in this World Cup (in brackets victory for all time)
 , 4 (7) first places
 , 3 (21) first places
 , 2 (22) first places
 , 1 (16) first places
 , 1 (6) first places
 , 1 (5) first places
 , 1 (4) first places
 , 1 (3) first places

References

External links
FIS-Ski Home Nordic Combined – Official Web Site

FIS Nordic Combined World Cup, 2012–13
FIS Nordic Combined World Cup
Qualification events for the 2014 Winter Olympics
Nordic Combined